Frame semantics can refer to:

Kripke semantics - semantics for modal logics
Frame semantics (linguistics) - linguistic theory developed by Charles J. Fillmore